The Anhak Palace (ko: 안학궁) was the royal residence of the Goguryeo Kingdom after the capital was moved to Pyongyang from Gungnae. Originally built in 427 AD, the palace is located in the Taesong District of Pyongyang, North Korea, at the foot of Mount Taesong.

The layout of the palace closely followed Korean architecture system using Korean fortress system. It was the palace where the king usually lived. The nobility and ordinary people lived outside this castle, and the outer fortress surrounding the urban area was present. There was a moat outside the east and west walls of the palace. The inside of the complex was composed of large separate palaces and corridors, as well as artificial gardens and lakes. 52 palace sites were identified. It was built after the transfer of the capital to Pyongyang, during which political groups familiar with Korean culture became a new bureaucratic group under the king's patronage.

Three streams flow down the mountain; one leading into a pond within the palace, the other two filling moats to the east and west of the complex. The palace featured landscaped gardens.

See also
 Pyongyang
 Taesong Fortress
 Pyongyang Castle

References 

National Treasures of North Korea
Buildings and structures in Pyongyang
Palaces in Korea
Goguryeo
Buildings and structures completed in the 5th century
Royal residences in North Korea
5th-century establishments in Korea
Traditional East Asian Architecture